is a Japanese-born American mathematician. He specializes in set theory and is the author of the monograph on large cardinals, The Higher Infinite. He has written several essays on the history of mathematics, especially set theory.

Kanamori graduated from California Institute of Technology and earned a Ph.D. from the University of Cambridge (King's College). He is a professor of mathematics at Boston University.

With Matthew Foreman he is the editor of the Handbook of Set Theory (2010).

Selected publications
 A. Kanamori, M. Magidor: The evolution of large cardinal axioms in set theory, in: Higher set theory (Proc. Conf., Math. Forschungsinst., Oberwolfach,  1977), Lecture Notes in Mathematics, 669, Springer, 99–275.
 R. M. Solovay, W. N. Reinhardt, A. Kanamori: Strong axioms of infinity and elementary embeddings, Annals of Mathematical Logic, 13(1978), 73–116.
 A. Kanamori: The Higher Infinite. Large Cardinals in Set Theory from their Beginnings., Perspectives in Mathematical Logic. Springer-Verlag, Berlin,  1994. xxiv+536 pp.

Honors 
Marshall Scholarship

References

External links
 Kanamori's homepage with selected publications
 Short CV

1948 births
Living people
20th-century American mathematicians
21st-century American mathematicians
Set theorists
Boston University faculty
Japanese emigrants to the United States
American academics of Japanese descent